Picerni is an Italian surname. Notable people with the surname include:

Jair Picerni (born 1944), Brazilian footballer and manager
Paul Picerni (1922–2011), American actor

Italian-language surnames